Josiah Duane Hicks (August 1, 1844May 9, 1923) was a Republican member of the U.S. House of Representatives from Pennsylvania.

Biography
Josiah D. Hicks was born in Machen, Monmouthshire, Wales.  He immigrated to the United States with his parents, who settled in Chester County, Pennsylvania, in 1847, and in the same year moved to Duncansville, Pennsylvania.  He attended the common schools of Blair and Huntingdon Counties.  He moved to Altoona, Pennsylvania, in 1861.

During the American Civil War, he enlisted in the One Hundred and Twenty-fifth Regiment, Pennsylvania Volunteer Infantry, as a private in 1862 and served nearly eighteen months.  He reentered civil life as a clerk on the Pennsylvania Railroad.  He studied law, was admitted to the bar in 1875 and commenced practice in Tyrone, Pennsylvania.  He was elected district attorney of Blair County in 1880, and reelected in 1883.

He married Josephine Barrick, a native of Frederick county, MD. She descended from the Harbaugh family. The history of the family is almost coextensive with the history of the country. The Harbaughs settled in Maryland in colonial times.

Hicks was elected as a Republican to the Fifty-third, Fifty-fourth, and Fifty-fifth Congresses.  He served as chairman of the United States House Committee on Patents during the Fifty-fifth Congress.  He was not a candidate for renomination in 1898.  He resumed the practice of law, and served as a member of the Altoona Board of Education from 1911 to 1919.  He served as State commander of the Grand Army of the Republic in 1921.  He died in Altoona in 1923 and is interred in Fairview Cemetery.

References

External links
 Retrieved on 2008-02-14
The Political Graveyard

Pennsylvania lawyers
Politicians from Altoona, Pennsylvania
Union Army soldiers
Welsh emigrants to the United States
1844 births
1923 deaths
People of Pennsylvania in the American Civil War
Republican Party members of the United States House of Representatives from Pennsylvania
19th-century American lawyers
Grand Army of the Republic officials